Sweet Relief: A Benefit for Victoria Williams is a 1993 tribute album that features a variety of alternative rock bands covering songs written by Victoria Williams. Except for “Crazy Mary”, which she was to record on Loose and “This Moment”, all these songs had been recorded on either Happy Come Home or Swing the Statue!. The project was inspired by Williams being diagnosed with multiple sclerosis, and led to the creation of the Sweet Relief Fund, a charity that aids professional musicians (of any stature) in need of health care.

A sequel album, Sweet Relief II: Gravity of the Situation, was released in 1996.

Reception

Music critic Roch Parisien of Allmusic praised the album, writing it "offers a unique opportunity to introduce yourself to an enduring songwriter while savoring some of the day's most intriguing musicians."

Track listing 
 Soul Asylum – "Summer of Drugs"
 Lucinda Williams – "Main Road"
 Pearl Jam – "Crazy Mary"
 Buffalo Tom – "Merry Go Round"
 Michael Penn – "Weeds"
 Shudder To Think – "Animal Wild"
 Lou Reed – "Tarbelly and Featherfoot"
 Maria McKee – "Opelousas (Sweet Relief)"
 Matthew Sweet – "This Moment"
 Evan Dando – "Frying Pan"
 The Jayhawks – "Lights"
 The Waterboys – "Why Look at the Moon"
 Giant Sand – "Big Fish"
 Michelle Shocked – "Holy Spirit"

References

Victoria Williams tribute albums
1993 compilation albums
Charity albums
Alternative rock compilation albums
Thirsty Ear Recordings compilation albums